The Orca-class patrol vessels are a class of eight steel-hulled training and surveillance vessels in service with the Royal Canadian Navy (RCN) at Patrol Craft Training Unit (PCTU) Canadian Forces Base (CFB) Esquimalt. Based on the Australian Pacific-class patrol boat design, all of the Orca vessels were constructed by Victoria Shipyards between November 2004 and November 2008. In addition to carrying the RCN designation of patrol craft training (PCT), the Orca-class are not formally commissioned in the RCN and as such do not possess the His Majesty's Canadian Ship (HMCS) prefix.

Design and construction
In the early 2000s, the Canadian Forces Maritime Command (MARCOM) began searching for a replacement for its aging 1950s-era wooden-hulled YAG 300 training tenders. While training aboard the YAG vessels was considered useful, initial training of naval officers was moving towards more modern land-based simulators that more accurately replicated the conditions aboard RCN capital ships. On 8 November 2004 the Department of National Defence (DND) announced a C$69.7 million contract for six new ships, with an option for two more for a total budget of C$90.7 million.

Based on the Australian Tenex Defence designed Pacific-class Seahorse Mercator, the Canadian-built Orca class shares the same hull design as the Australian vessel, but is uniquely 15% larger. Stretched to the maximum allowed by the contract, the Canadian Orca-class was designed to allow for the hull to be able to withstand any increase in the size and weight of future equipment. With the change in size, also came a change to the propulsion system, crew accommodations and bridge structure.

Designed to accommodate a 12.7 mm M2 machine gun, the foredeck was strengthened and extra fire protection was added, requiring a new firemain supply to the new ammunition storage lockers. This redesign led to several systems, including the auxiliary seawater and bilge systems to be upgraded. In addition, requirements under the Canada Shipping Act and Canadian naval requirements also necessitated the installation of a third generator, changing the electrical supply to 120 Volts/60 Hertz and a redesigned water cooling system.

Designed as a "'stepping stone' to larger fleet warships", the Orca was also designed with a larger wheelhouse fitted with warship-grade navigational equipment. The large bridge offers expansive views all around ensuring safety and enhancing training value. Below the bridge, is a sixteen-seat training room with reconfigurable seating, desks and a multimedia centre, also serves as a mess and medical area. As the training room sits atop of the machinery space, a multi-component acoustic system and absorbent material was used for sound deadening.

The Orca-class were the first vessels of its size to be built to the American Bureau of Shipping (ABS) High-Speed Naval Craft (HSNC) A1 classification and is constructed using CSA G40.21 50W/350WT high strength structural steel. Known for its reliability in cold climates, it is the same type of steel used in the Halifax-class frigate.

Able to be operated by a core crew of five, the maximum bunk space on the Orcas is twenty-four with two two-bunk cabins for the crew (officer in charge, executive officer, senior bosun's mate, Orca-class engineer) two six bunk cabins and two four bunk cabins for instructors and trainees. Each Orca carries one Zodiac SR2 inflatable rescue boat that holds two sailors.

Employment
As dedicated training tenders, the Orcas are primarily used to facilitate numerous one-to-six-week long at-sea training evolutions for training both regular and reserve force RCN naval officers. The vessels are also used to train non-commissioned members and provide an at sea experience for the teenage members of the Royal Canadian Sea Cadets. The Orcas are considered vessels of opportunity for surveillance and search and rescue and are all homeported at CFB Esquimalt.

During Operation Podium, the Canadian Forces support of the 2010 Vancouver Winter Olympics, three Orcas were temporarily fitted with 12.7 mm machine guns for port security duties.

On 15 June 2017, while  was docked at CFB Esquimalt, PCT 61 Cougar struck the submarine as it was exiting the dockyard. The initial inspection following the collision showed only superficial damage to the protective gear around the submarine and only minor damage to Cougars propeller.

Ships in class
During the early stages of the Second World War, the Canadian Government acquired fourteen large yachts from the United States and all were given animal names upon commissioning in the RCN All but Orca and Raven perpetuate the names of those armed yachts and all have a connection to First Nations lore. Cougar, Moose, and Wolf are the third vessels to carry those names as they also perpetuate the names of Canadian Fairmile B motor launches used by the Canadian Forces Naval Reserve as training ships after the Second World War.

All eight Orca-class vessels were constructed by Victoria Shipyards at Victoria, British Columbia with the first in class PCT 55 Orca, was laid down in September 2005, launched in August 2006, and delivered to MARCOM in November 2006. The remaining Orcas delivered were: PCT 56 Raven in March 2007; PCT 57 Caribou in July 2007; PCT 58 Renard in September 2007; PCT 59 Wolf in November 2007; PCT 60 Grizzly in March 2008; PCT Cougar in July 2008 and PCT 62 Moose in November 2008.

Gallery

External links 

DND/CF page on the Orca-class vessels
Canadian American Strategic Review
CASR: Background — the Origins of the Orca-Class Patrol Craft, Training
Interview with Bill van Dinther

References 

Ships built in British Columbia
 
Auxiliary training ship classes
Auxiliary search and rescue ship classes
Naval ships of Canada